Isaac Bradley Bassindale (26 January 1896 – 1985) was an English footballer who played in the Football League for Oldham Athletic.

References

1896 births
1985 deaths
English footballers
Association football midfielders
English Football League players
Hartlepool United F.C. players
Oldham Athletic A.F.C. players
Mossley A.F.C. players